Mathematical Geosciences (formerly Mathematical Geology) is a scientific journal published semi-quarterly by Springer Science+Business Media on behalf of the International Association for Mathematical Geosciences. It contains original papers in mathematical geosciences. The journal focuses on quantitative methods and studies of the Earth and its natural resources and environment. Its impact factor is 1.909.

References

External links
 

Earth and atmospheric sciences journals
Mathematics journals